In algebraic topology, a branch of mathematics, a homotopy sphere is an n-manifold that is homotopy equivalent to the n-sphere. It thus has the same homotopy groups and the same homology groups as the n-sphere, and so every homotopy sphere is necessarily a homology sphere.

The topological generalized Poincaré conjecture is that any n-dimensional homotopy sphere is homeomorphic to the n-sphere; it was solved by Stephen Smale in dimensions five and higher, by Michael Freedman in dimension 4, and for dimension 3 (the original Poincaré conjecture) by Grigori Perelman in 2005.

The resolution of the smooth Poincaré conjecture in dimensions 5 and larger implies that homotopy spheres in those dimensions are precisely exotic spheres.  It is still an open question whether or not there are non-trivial smooth homotopy spheres in dimension 4.

References

See also
Homology sphere
Homotopy groups of spheres
Poincaré conjecture

Homotopy theory
Topological spaces